Michel Lorran Rodrigues Mota (born 10 January 1993 in Brazil), known as just Lorran, is a Brazilian footballer.

Career

Named after Lucien Laurent, the scorer of the first-ever World Cup goal, Lorran started his career with Flamengo, receiving praise from coach Vanderlei Luxemburgo and the team's star players, including Ronaldinho during his first professional training session. However, each time he tried to join the first team he was told it was too early and barely featured for the club. After Flamengo refused offers from Europe, he asked to leave for Madueira for game time despite his father's opposition, where he was injured immediately. 

In 2018, Lorran was shot in the leg while in a car with drug trafficker Cesar Augusto Oliveira Ferreira, who was killed.

References

External links

 Lorran at Soccerway

Brazilian footballers
1993 births
Living people
Association football midfielders
CR Flamengo footballers
Madureira Esporte Clube players
Grêmio Esportivo Anápolis players
Bangu Atlético Clube players
Sport Club São Paulo players